Juan Herrera Sánchez (27 December 1939 – 20 November 2014), known as Herrerita, was a Spanish professional footballer who played as a forward.

Career
Born in Gines, Herrerita played for Recreativo de Huelva, Mallorca and Badajoz.

References

1939 births
2014 deaths
Spanish footballers
Recreativo de Huelva players
RCD Mallorca players
CD Badajoz players
Segunda División players
La Liga players
Association football forwards